International University of Struga (Macedonian: Меѓународен Универзитет Струга, Albanian:Universiteti Ndërkombetar i Strugës) is a university in North Macedonia. The university has two campuses based in Struga and Gostivar with roughly 2,500 students. The International University of Struga has four faculties: Faculty of Economy and Business, Faculty of Law, Faculty of Political Science and Information Technology.

Faculties and study programs

Academic staff
International University of Struga academic staff.

References

External links 

 / International University of Struga (in Macedonian, English, Albanian, Turkish)

Universities in North Macedonia
Educational institutions established in 2005
2005 establishments in the Republic of Macedonia
Education in Struga